The Bougainville Photoplay Project is a verbatim play by Paul Dwyer and Version 1.0.

Plot
Writer, academic and performer Paul Dwyer looks back at trips made by his father, Dr Allan Dwyer, a world-renowned orthopaedic surgeon, who visited Bougainville during the 1960s, healing crippled children. Family stories mesh with the larger narrative of Australian colonial influence in the years following.

First Production
The Bougainville Photoplay Project was first performed at the National Multicultural Festival Fringe in Canberra in February 2008, with the following participants:

Paul Dwyer:	Researcher and Storyteller

David Williams:	Director and Stage Manager

Sean Bacon:	Video Artist

Subsequent performances have been for the Liveworks Festival at the Performance Space, Sydney (2008); at the Old Fitzroy Theatre, Sydney (2009); and a Mobile States Tour for Performing Lines (2010) which toured to Arts House at North Melbourne Town Hall, Darwin Arts Festival at Browns Mart Theatre, Powerhouse Arts Centre in Brisbane, and Perth Institute of Contemporary Arts.

References

Australian plays
2010 plays